The West German Athletics Championships was an annual outdoor track and field competition organised by the German Athletics Association, which served as the West German national championships for the sport. The two- or three-day event was held in summer months, varying from late June to early August, and the venue changed annually. The winners were almost exclusively West German nationals, though a small number of foreign athletes were invited to compete, and won.

The German Athletics Championships had a long history, dating back to 1898. After the division of Germany at the end of World War II, the organising body of the all-Germany championships, the German Athletics Association, remained in West Germany. As a result, when the national championships resumed in 1946, only West German athletes could compete in them. East German athletes were re-incorporated into the event in 1991, restoring the status of the competition as an all-Germany event.

Men

100 metres
1960: Armin Hary
1961: Manfred Germar
1962: Heinz Schumann
1963: Alfred Hebauf
1964: Manfred Knickenberg
1965: Manfred Knickenberg
1966: Manfred Knickenberg
1967: Harmut Wilke
1968: Gert Metz
1969: Gert Metz
1970: Günther Nickel
1971: Karl-Heinz Klotz
1972: Manfred Ommer
1973: Jobst Hirscht
1974: Manfred Ommer
1975: Klaus Ehl
1976: Dieter Steinmann
1977: Bernd Sattler
1978: Werner Zaske
1979: Fritz Heer
1980: Christian Haas
1981: Christian Haas
1982: Christian Haas
1983: Christian Haas
1984: Ralf Lübke
1985: Christian Haas
1986: Christian Haas
1987: Christian Haas
1988: Andreas Maul
1989: Wolfgang Haupt
1990: Peter Klein

200 metres
1960: Armin Hary
1961: Manfred Germar
1962: Manfred Germar
1963: Alfred Hebauf
1964: Heinz Schumann
1965: Josef Schwarz
1966: Manfred Knickenberg
1967: Martin Jellinghaus
1968: Martin Jellinghaus
1969: Jochen Eigenherr
1970: Jochen Eigenherr
1971: Karl-Heinz Klotz
1972: Manfred Ommer
1973: Franz-Peter Hofmeister
1974: Manfred Ommer
1975: Klaus Ehl
1976: Karlheinz Weisenseel
1977: Bernd Sattler
1978: Franz-Peter Hofmeister
1979: Franz-Peter Hofmeister
1980: Christian Haas
1981: Erwin Skamrahl
1982: Erwin Skamrahl
1983: Erwin Skamrahl
1984: Ralf Lübke
1985: Ralf Lübke
1986: Ralf Lübke
1987: Christian Haas
1988: Ralf Lübke
1989: Erwin Skamrahl
1990: Peter Klein

400 metres
1960: Carl Kaufmann
1961: Johannes Kaiser
1962: Hans-Joachim Reske
1963: Jürgen Kalfelder
1964: Jürgen Kalfelder
1965: Jens Ulbricht
1966: Siegfried König
1967: Fritz Roderfeld
1968: Martin Jellinghaus
1969: Martin Jellinghaus
1970: Thomas Jordan
1971: Hermann Köhler
1972: Karl Honz
1973: Karl Honz
1974: Bernd Herrmann
1975: Bernd Herrmann
1976: Lothar Krieg
1977: Bernd Herrmann
1978: Franz-Peter Hofmeister
1979: Harald Schmid
1980: Erwin Skamrahl
1981: Hartmut Weber
1982: Erwin Skamrahl
1983: Hartmut Weber
1984: Erwin Skamrahl
1985: Erwin Skamrahl
1986: Ralf Lübke
1987: Mark Henrich
1988: Ralf Lübke
1989: Norbert Dobeleit
1990: Norbert Dobeleit

800 metres
1960: Paul Schmidt
1961: Paul Schmidt
1962: Paul Schmidt
1963: Manfred Kinder
1964: Manfred Kinder
1965: Franz-Josef Kemper
1966: Franz-Josef Kemper
1967: Franz-Josef Kemper
1968: Walter Adams
1969: Walter Adams
1970: Franz-Josef Kemper
1971: Franz-Josef Kemper
1972: Walter Adams
1973: Paul-Heinz Wellmann
1974: Willi Wülbeck
1975: Willi Wülbeck
1976: Willi Wülbeck
1977: Willi Wülbeck
1978: Willi Wülbeck
1979: Willi Wülbeck
1980: Willi Wülbeck
1981: Willi Wülbeck
1982: Willi Wülbeck
1983: Willi Wülbeck
1984: Axel Harries
1985: Matthias Assmann
1986: Matthias Assmann
1987: Peter Braun
1988: Thomas Giessing
1989: Peter Braun
1990: Jussi Udelhoven

1500 metres
1960: Adolf Schwarte
1961: Karl Eyerkaufer
1962: Harald Norpoth
1963: Harald Norpoth
1964: Harald Norpoth
1965: Bodo Tümmler
1966: Bodo Tümmler
1967: Bodo Tümmler
1968: Bodo Tümmler
1969: Bodo Tümmler
1970: Jürgen May
1971: Bodo Tümmler
1972: Bodo Tümmler
1973: Paul-Heinz Wellmann
1974: Paul-Heinz Wellmann
1975: Thomas Wessinghage
1976: Paul-Heinz Wellmann
1977: Thomas Wessinghage
1978: Thomas Wessinghage
1979: Thomas Wessinghage
1980: Thomas Wessinghage
1981: Thomas Wessinghage
1982: Thomas Wessinghage
1983: Uwe Becker
1984: Uwe Becker
1985: Uwe Becker
1986: Uwe Mönkemeyer
1987: Dieter Baumann
1988: Dieter Baumann
1989: Dieter Baumann
1990: Eckhardt Rüter

5000 metres
1960: Alfred Kleefeldt
1961: Roland Watschke
1962: Peter Kubicki
1963: Peter Kubicki
1964: Werner Girke
1965: Werner Girke
1966: Harald Norpoth
1967: Harald Norpoth
1968: Harald Norpoth
1969: Harald Norpoth
1970: Harald Norpoth
1971: Harald Norpoth
1972: Harald Norpoth
1973: Harald Norpoth
1974: Hans-Jürgen Orthmann
1975: Klaus-Peter Hildenbrand
1976: Klaus-Peter Hildenbrand
1977: Karl Fleschen
1978: Frank Zimmermann
1979: Frank Zimmermann
1980: Karl Fleschen
1981: Karl Fleschen
1982: Thomas Wessinghage
1983: Paul Nothacker
1984: Karl Fleschen
1985: Thomas Wessinghage
1986: Dieter Baumann
1987: Thomas Wessinghage
1988: Dieter Baumann
1989: Christian Husmann
1990: Steffen Brand

10,000 metres
1960: Roland Watschke
1961: Roland Watschke
1962: Peter Kubicki
1963: Peter Kubicki
1964: Horst Flosbach
1965: Lutz Philipp
1966: Manfred Letzerich
1967: Lutz Philipp
1968: Manfred Letzerich
1969: Joachim Leiss
1970: Manfred Letzerich
1971: Jens Wollenberg
1972: Lutz Philipp
1973: Detlef Uhlemann
1974: Detlef Uhlemann
1975: Detlef Uhlemann
1976: Klaus-Peter Hildenbrand
1977: Detlef Uhlemann
1978: Karl Fleschen
1979: Karl Fleschen
1980: Karl Fleschen
1981: Karl Fleschen
1982: Hans-Jürgen Orthmann
1983: Christoph Herle
1984: Christoph Herle
1985: Christoph Herle
1986: Christoph Herle
1987: Herbert Steffny
1988: Ralf Salzmann
1989: Kurt Stenzel
1990: Kurt Stenzel

25K run
1977: 
1978: Karl Fleschen
1979: Hans-Jürgen Orthmann
1980: Hans-Jürgen Orthmann
1981: Andreas Weniger
1982: Michael Spöttel
1983: Günther Zahn
1984: Herbert Steffny
1985: Herbert Steffny
1986: Michael Scheytt
1987: Dirk Sander
1988: Herbert Steffny
1989: Kurt Stenzel
1990: Kurt Stenzel

Marathon
1960: Jürgen Wedeking
1961: Jürgen Wedeking
1962: Werner Zylka
1963: Jürgen Wedeking
1964: Gideon Papke
1965: Lothar Reinshagen
1966: Karl-Heinz Sievers
1967: Karl-Heinz Sievers
1968: Hubert Riesner
1969: Hubert Riesner
1970: Hans Hellbach
1971: Lutz Philipp
1972: Lutz Philipp
1973: Lutz Philipp
1974: Anton Gorbunow
1975: Günter Mielke
1976: Paul Angenvoorth
1977: Günter Mielke
1978: Reinhard Leibold
1979: Michael Spöttel
1980: Ralf Salzmann
1981: Ralf Salzmann
1982: Ralf Salzmann
1983: Ralf Salzmann
1984: Ralf Salzmann
1985: Herbert Steffny
1986: Wolfgang Krüger
1987: Guido Dold
1988: Udo Reeh
1989: Uwe Hartmann
1990: Josef Oefele

100K run
1987: Werner Dörrenbächer
1988: Heinz Hüglin
1989: Heinz Hüglin
1990: Karl-Heinz Doll

3000 metres steeplechase
1960: Heinz Laufer
1961: Wilhelm-Rüdiger Böhme
1962: Wolfgang Fricke
1963: Ludwig Müller
1964: Alfons Ida
1965: Manfred Letzerich
1966: Hans-Werner Wogatzky
1967: Manfred Letzerich
1968: Klaus-Ludwig Brosius
1969: Willi Wagner
1970: Rolf Burscheid
1971: Jürgen May
1972: Willi Wagner
1973: Willi Maier
1974: Michael Karst
1975: Michael Karst
1976: Michael Karst
1977: Michael Karst
1978: Patriz Ilg
1979: Michael Karst
1980: Patriz Ilg
1981: Patriz Ilg
1982: Patriz Ilg
1983: Rainer Schwarz
1984: Torsten Tiller
1985: Patriz Ilg
1986: Patriz Ilg
1987: Patriz Ilg
1988: Patriz Ilg
1989: Hubert Karl
1990: Michael Heist

110 metres hurdles
1960: Martin Lauer
1961: Klaus Willimczik
1962: Klaus Nüske
1963: Klaus Willimczik
1964: Hinrich John
1965: Hinrich John
1966: Hinrich John
1967: Hinrich John
1968: Hinrich John
1969: Günther Nickel
1970: Günther Nickel
1971: Manfred Schumann
1972: Günther Nickel
1973: Eckart Berkes
1974: Manfred Schumann
1975: Dieter Gebhard
1976: Rolf Ziegler
1977: Dieter Gebhard
1978: Guido Kratschmer
1979: Karl-Werner Dönges
1980: Dieter Gebhard
1981: Karl-Werner Dönges
1982: Karl-Werner Dönges
1983: Axel Schaumann
1984: Peter Scholz
1985: Michael Radzey
1986: Siegfried Wentz
1987: Florian Schwarthoff
1988: Florian Schwarthoff
1989: Dietmar Koszewski
1990: Florian Schwarthoff

200 metres hurdles
1960: Martin Lauer
1961: Klaus Gerbig
1962: Willi Holdorf
1963: Klaus Gerbig
1964: Joachim Hellmich
1965: Hinrich John

400 metres hurdles
1960: Helmut Janz
1961: Helmut Janz
1962: Helmut Janz
1963: Helmut Janz
1964: Horst Gieseler
1965: Rainer Schubert
1966: Gerd Lossdörfer
1967: Rainer Schubert
1968: Rainer Schubert
1969: Rainer Schubert
1970: Werner Reibert
1971: Dieter Büttner
1972: Dieter Büttner
1973: Werner Reibert
1974: Rolf Ziegler
1975: Werner Reibert
1976: Rolf Ziegler
1977: Harald Schmid
1978: Harald Schmid
1979: Bernd Herrmann
1980: Harald Schmid
1981: Harald Schmid
1982: Harald Schmid
1983: Harald Schmid
1984: Harald Schmid
1985: Harald Schmid
1986: Harald Schmid
1987: Harald Schmid
1988: Harald Schmid
1989: Harald Schmid
1990: Carsten Köhrbrück

High jump
1960: Theo Püll
1961: Theo Püll
1962: Herbert Hopf
1963: Herbert Hopf
1964: Wolfgang Schillkowski
1965: Wolfgang Schillkowski
1966: Ingomar Sieghart
1967: Wolfgang Schillkowski
1968: Thomas Zacharias
1969: Ingomar Sieghart
1970: Hermann Magerl
1971: Günther Spielvogel
1972: Hermann Magerl
1973: Lothar Doster
1974: Walter Boller
1975: Walter Boller
1976: Walter Boller
1977: André Schneider-Laub
1978: André Schneider-Laub
1979: Gerd Nagel
1980: Dietmar Mögenburg
1981: Dietmar Mögenburg
1982: Dietmar Mögenburg
1983: Dietmar Mögenburg
1984: Dietmar Mögenburg
1985: Dietmar Mögenburg
1986: Carlo Thränhardt
1987: Dietmar Mögenburg
1988: Dietmar Mögenburg
1989: Dietmar Mögenburg
1990: Dietmar Mögenburg

Pole vault
1960: Klaus Lehnertz
1961: Klaus Lehnertz
1962: Dieter Möhring
1963: Wolfgang Reinhardt
1964: Wolfgang Reinhardt
1965: Wolfgang Reinhardt
1966: Klaus Lehnertz
1967: Klaus Lehnertz
1968: Klaus Lehnertz
1969: Heinfried Engel
1970: Volker Ohl
1971: Hans-Jürgen Ziegler
1972: Reinhard Kuretzky
1973: Volker Ohl
1974: 
1975: Günther Lohre
1976: Günther Lohre
1977: Günther Lohre
1978: Günther Lohre
1979: Günther Lohre
1980: Günther Lohre
1981: Gerhard Schmidt
1982: Günther Lohre
1983: Günther Lohre
1984: Günther Lohre
1985: Jürgen Winkler
1986: Władysław Kozakiewicz
1987: Władysław Kozakiewicz
1988: Władysław Kozakiewicz
1989: Bernhard Zintl
1990: Bernhard Zintl

Long jump
1960: Manfred Steinbach
1961: Manfred Steinbach
1962: Manfred Steinbach
1963: Wolfgang Klein
1964: Wolfgang Klein
1965: Jörg Jüttner
1966: Hermann Latzel
1967: Uwe Töppner
1968: Hermann Latzel
1969: Reinhold Boschert
1970: Josef Schwarz
1971: Hans Baumgartner
1972: Hans Baumgartner
1973: Hans Baumgartner
1974: Hans Baumgartner
1975: Joachim Busse
1976: Hans-Jürgen Berger
1977: Jochen Verschl
1978: Jochen Verschl
1979: Jens Knipphals
1980: Jens Knipphals
1981: Joachim Busse
1982: Jörg Klocke
1983: Jürgen Hingsen
1984: Joachim Busse
1985: Jürgen Wörner
1986: Dietmar Haaf
1987: Dietmar Haaf
1988: Dietmar Haaf
1989: Dietmar Haaf
1990: Dietmar Haaf

Triple jump
1960: Heinz Schott
1961: Jörg Wischmeier
1962: Günther Zeiss
1963: Michael Sauer
1964: Michael Sauer
1965: Michael Sauer
1966: Günther Krivec
1967: Michael Sauer
1968: Michael Sauer
1969: Michael Sauer
1970: Michael Sauer
1971: Michael Sauer
1972: Richard Kick
1973: Richard Kick
1974: Joachim Kugler
1975: Joachim Kugler
1976: Wolfgang Kolmsee
1977: Klaus Kübler
1978: Dieter Eckert
1979: Douglas Henderson
1980: Klaus Kübler
1981: Peter Bouschen
1982: Douglas Henderson
1983: Peter Bouschen
1984: Ralf Jaros
1985: Ralf Jaros
1986: Peter Bouschen
1987: Peter Bouschen
1988: Wolfgang Knabe
1989: Wolfgang Zinser
1990: Ralf Jaros

Shot put
1960: Dieter Urbach
1961: Dieter Urbach
1962: Dieter Urbach
1963: Dieter Urbach
1964: Dieter Urbach
1965: Werner Heger
1966: Heinfried Birlenbach
1967: Heinfried Birlenbach
1968: Heinfried Birlenbach
1969: Heinfried Birlenbach
1970: Heinfried Birlenbach
1971: Heinfried Birlenbach
1972: Ralf Reichenbach
1973: Ralf Reichenbach
1974: Ralf Reichenbach
1975: Ralf Reichenbach
1976: Gerhard Steines
1977: Ralf Reichenbach
1978: Ralf Reichenbach
1979: Ralf Reichenbach
1980: Ralf Reichenbach
1981: Ralf Reichenbach
1982: Udo Gelhausen
1983: Claus-Dieter Föhrenbach
1984: Karsten Stolz
1985: Bernd Kneißler
1986: Karsten Stolz
1987: Karsten Stolz
1988: Karsten Stolz
1989: Karsten Stolz
1990: Kalman Konya

Discus throw
1960: Dieter Möhring
1961: Jens Reimers
1962: Jens Reimers
1963: Jens Reimers
1964: Josef Klik
1965: Jens Reimers
1966: Hein-Direck Neu
1967: Hein-Direck Neu
1968: Hein-Direck Neu
1969: Hein-Direck Neu
1970: Dirk Wippermann
1971: Klaus-Peter Hennig
1972: Dirk Wippermann
1973: Klaus-Peter Hennig
1974: Hein-Direck Neu
1975: Klaus-Peter Hennig
1976: Hein-Direck Neu
1977: 
1978: Hein-Direck Neu
1979: Werner Hartmann
1980: Rolf Danneberg
1981: Alwin Wagner
1982: Alwin Wagner
1983: Alwin Wagner
1984: Alwin Wagner
1985: Alwin Wagner
1986: Alois Hannecker
1987: Alois Hannecker
1988: Rolf Danneberg
1989: Rolf Danneberg
1990: Wolfgang Schmidt

Hammer throw
1960: Siegfried Lorenz
1961: Hans Fahsl
1962: Hans Fahsl
1963: Hans Fahsl
1964: Uwe Beyer
1965: Uwe Beyer
1966: Uwe Beyer
1967: Uwe Beyer
1968: Uwe Beyer
1969: Uwe Beyer
1970: Uwe Beyer
1971: Uwe Beyer
1972: Edwin Klein
1973: Karl-Hans Riehm
1974: Edwin Klein
1975: Karl-Hans Riehm
1976: Karl-Hans Riehm
1977: Karl-Hans Riehm
1978: Karl-Hans Riehm
1979: Karl-Hans Riehm
1980: Karl-Hans Riehm
1981: Karl-Hans Riehm
1982: Klaus Ploghaus
1983: Karl-Hans Riehm
1984: Karl-Hans Riehm
1985: Christoph Sahner
1986: Christoph Sahner
1987: Jörg Schäfer
1988: Heinz Weis
1989: Heinz Weis
1990: Heinz Weis

Javelin throw
1960: Hermann Salomon
1961: Rolf Herings
1962: Hermann Salomon
1963: Hermann Salomon
1964: Hermann Salomon
1965: Rolf Herings
1966: Eugen Stumpp
1967: Hermann Salomon
1968: Hermann Salomon
1969: Klaus Wolfermann
1970: Klaus Wolfermann
1971: Klaus Wolfermann
1972: Klaus Wolfermann
1973: Klaus Wolfermann
1974: Klaus Wolfermann
1975: Jörg Hein
1976: Michael Wessing
1977: Michael Wessing
1978: Michael Wessing
1979: Michael Wessing
1980: Michael Wessing
1981: Helmut Schreiber
1982: Klaus Tafelmeier
1983: Klaus Tafelmeier
1984: Klaus Tafelmeier
1985: Klaus Tafelmeier
1986: Wolfram Gambke
1987: Klaus Tafelmeier
1988: Peter Blank
1989: Klaus-Peter Schneider
1990: Peter Blank

Pentathlon
1960: Hermann Salomon
1961: Hermann Salomon
1962: Hermann Salomon
1963: Gerold Jericho
1964: Hermann Salomon
1965: Horst Kley
1966: Kurt Bendlin
1967: Herbert Swoboda
1968: Horst Kley
1969: Wolfgang Tilly
1970: Erich Klamma
1971: Kurt Bendlin
1972: Manfred Bock
1973: Günther Grube

Decathlon
1960: Peter Gerber
1961: Willi Holdorf
1962: Manfred Bock
1963: Willi Holdorf
1964: Hans-Joachim Walde
1965: Kurt Bendlin
1966: Werner von Moltke
1967: Kurt Bendlin
1968: Werner von Moltke
1969: Hans-Joachim Walde
1970: Horst Beyer
1971: Kurt Bendlin
1972: Horst Beyer
1973: Herbert Swoboda
1974: Kurt Bendlin
1975: Guido Kratschmer
1976: Guido Kratschmer
1977: Guido Kratschmer
1978: Guido Kratschmer
1979: Guido Kratschmer
1980: Guido Kratschmer
1981: Andreas Rizzi
1982: Jürgen Hingsen
1983: Siegfried Wentz
1984: Abandoned
1985: Siegfried Wentz
1986: Jens Schulze
1987: Michael Neugebauer
1988: Rainer Sonnenburg
1989: Karl-Heinz Fichtner
1990: Michael Kohnle

20 kilometres walk
1960: Claus Biethan
1961: Wolfgang Döring
1962: Karl-Heinz Pape
1963: Julius Müller
1964: Hannes Koch
1965: Hannes Koch
1966: Karl-Heinz Pape
1967: Karl-Heinz Pape
1968: Bernhard Nermerich
1969: Julius Müller
1970: Bernhard Nermerich
1971: Wilfried Wesch
1972: Bernd Kannenberg
1973: Gerhard Weidner
1974: Bernd Kannenberg
1975: Bernd Kannenberg
1976: Gerhard Weidner
1977: Gerhard Weidner
1978: Alfons Schwarz
1979: Gerhard Weidner
1980: Heinrich Schubert
1981: Alfons Schwarz
1982: Alfons Schwarz
1983: Franz-Josef Weber
1984: Alfons Schwarz
1985: Alfons Schwarz
1986: Wolfgang Wiedemann
1987: Volkmar Scholz
1988: Torsten Zervas
1989: Volkmar Scholz
1990: Robert Ihly

50 kilometres walk
1960: Claus Biethan
1961: Heinz Mayr
1962: Julius Müller
1963: Gert Jannsen
1964: Bernhard Nermerich
1965: Karl-Heinz Pape
1966: Gerhard Weidner
1967: Bernhard Nermerich
1968: Bernhard Nermerich
1969: Bernhard Nermerich
1970: Peter Schuster
1971: Bernhard Nermerich
1972: Bernd Kannenberg
1973: Bernd Kannenberg
1974: Gerhard Weidner
1975: Bernd Kannenberg
1976: Gerhard Weidner
1977: Gerhard Weidner
1978: Hans Binder
1979: Hans Binder
1980: Heinrich Schubert
1981: Karl Degener
1982: Karl Degener
1983: Karl Degener
1984: Walter Schwoche
1985: Hans-Joachim Matern
1986: Alfons Schwarz
1987: Alfons Schwarz
1988: Alfons Schwarz
1989: Robert Ihly
1990: Robert Ihly

Cross country (long course)
1960: Ludwig Müller
1961: Horst Flosbach
1962: Peter Kubicki
1963: Peter Kubicki
1964: Harald Norpoth
1965: Hans Hüneke
1966: Manfred Letzerich
1967: Lutz Philipp
1968: Manfred Letzerich
1969: Lutz Philipp
1970: Lutz Philipp
1971: Lutz Philipp
1972: Lutz Philipp
1973: Lutz Philipp
1974: Detlef Uhlemann
1975: Detlef Uhlemann
1976: Edmundo Warnke
1977: Edmundo Warnke
1978: Edmundo Warnke
1979: Christoph Herle
1980: Christoph Herle
1981: Christoph Herle
1982: Ralf Salzmann
1983: Hans-Jürgen Orthmann
1984: Hans-Jürgen Orthmann
1985: Christoph Herle
1986: Werner Grommisch
1987: Konrad Dobler
1988: Christoph Herle
1989: Herbert Steffny
1990: Detlef Schwarz

Cross country (short course)
1961: Wilhelm-Rüdiger Böhme
1962: Karl Eyerkaufer
1963: Bernd Windel
1964: Bodo Tümmler
1965: Bodo Tümmler
1966: Harald Norpoth
1967: Harald Norpoth
1968: Harald Norpoth
1969: Jürgen May
1970: Harald Norpoth
1971: Harald Norpoth
1972: Harald Norpoth
1973: Willi Maier
1974: Wolfgang Riesinger
1975: Günther Kohl
1976: Günther Zahn
1977: Günther Zahn
1978: Günther Zahn
1979: Manfred Schoeneberg
1980: Hans-Jürgen Orthmann
1981: Patriz Ilg
1982: Uwe Mönkemeyer
1983: Uwe Mönkemeyer
1984: Uwe Mönkemeyer
1985: Uwe Becker
1986: Volker Welzel
1987: Daniel Gottschall
1988: Uwe Mönkemeyer
1989: Miroslaw Kuziola
1990: Ralf Eckert

Mountain running
1985: Peter Zipfel
1986: Michael Scheytt
1987: Michael Scheytt
1988: Karl-Heinz Doll
1989: Karl-Heinz Doll
1990: Wolfgang Münzel

Women

100 metres
1960: Anni Biechl
1961: Maren Collin
1962: Jutta Heine
1963: Gudrun Lenze
1964: Renate Meyer
1965: Erika Pollmann
1966: Hannelore Trabert
1967: Karin Reichert-Frisch
1968: Ingrid Becker
1969: Bärbel Hähnle
1970: Ingrid Becker
1971: Elfgard Schittenhelm
1972: Elfgard Schittenhelm
1973: Elfgard Schittenhelm
1974: Annegret Richter
1975: Inge Helten
1976: Annegret Richter
1977: Elvira Possekel
1978: Birgit Wilkes
1979: Annegret Richter
1980: Annegret Richter
1981: Monika Hirsch
1982: Resi März
1983: Sabine Klösters
1984: Heidi-Elke Gaugel
1985: Heidi-Elke Gaugel
1986: Heidi-Elke Gaugel
1987: Ulrike Sarvari
1988: Ulrike Sarvari
1989: Ulrike Sarvari
1990: Ulrike Sarvari

200 metres
1960: Brunhilde Hendrix
1961: Jutta Heine
1962: Jutta Heine
1963: Jutta Heine
1964: Erika Pollmann
1965: Erika Pollmann
1966: Kirsten Roggenkamp
1967: Hannelore Trabert
1968: Rita Wilden
1969: Rita Wilden
1970: Elfgard Schittenhelm
1971: Rita Wilden
1972: Annegret Kroniger
1973: Annegret Kroniger
1974: Annegret Richter
1975: Maren Gang
1976: Annegret Richter
1977: Dagmar Schenten
1978: Annegret Richter
1979: Annegret Richter
1980: Annegret Richter
1981: Claudia Steger
1982: Heike Schulte-Mattler
1983: Christina Sussiek
1984: Heidi-Elke Gaugel
1985: Heidi-Elke Gaugel
1986: Heidi-Elke Gaugel
1987: Ulrike Sarvari & Ute Thimm
1988: Andrea Thomas
1989: Andrea Thomas
1990: Silke-Beate Knoll

400 metres
1960: Maria Jeibmann
1961: Maria Jeibmann
1962: Helga Henning
1963: Helga Henning
1964: Erna Maisack
1965: Antje Gleichfeld
1966: Helga Henning
1967: Gisela Köpke
1968: Helga Henning
1969: Christel Frese
1970: Christel Frese
1971: Inge Bödding
1972: Rita Wilden
1973: Rita Wilden
1974: Rita Wilden
1975: Rita Wilden
1976: Rita Wilden
1977: Dagmar Fuhrmann
1978: Gaby Bußmann
1979: Elke Decker
1980: Gaby Bußmann
1981: Ute Thimm
1982: Gaby Bußmann
1983: Gaby Bußmann
1984: Ute Thimm
1985: Gisela Kinzel
1986: Gisela Kinzel
1987: Ute Thimm
1988: Helga Arendt
1989: Helga Arendt
1990: Karin Janke

800 metres
1960: Vera Kummerfeldt
1961: Antje Gleichfeld
1962: Vera Kummerfeldt
1963: Antje Gleichfeld
1964: Antje Gleichfeld
1965: Antje Gleichfeld
1966: Antje Gleichfeld
1967: Karin Kessler
1968: Karin Kessler
1969: Anita Rottmüller
1970: Hildegard Falck
1971: Hildegard Falck
1972: Sylvia Schenk
1973: Hildegard Falck
1974: Gisela Ellenberger
1975: Ellen Tittel
1976: Brigitte Kraus
1977: Ursula Hook
1978: Elisabeth Schacht
1979: Ursula Hook
1980: Margrit Klinger
1981: Margrit Klinger
1982: Margrit Klinger
1983: Margit Schultheiss
1984: Margrit Klinger
1985: Margrit Klinger
1986: Gaby Bußmann
1987: Margrit Klinger
1988: Gabriela Lesch
1989: Gabriela Lesch
1990: Gabriela Lesch

1500 metres
1968: Gerda Ranz
1969: Gerda Ranz
1970: Ellen Tittel
1971: Ellen Tittel
1972: Ellen Tittel
1973: Ellen Tittel
1974: Ellen Tittel
1975: Ellen Tittel
1976: Brigitte Kraus
1977: 
1978: Brigitte Kraus
1979: Brigitte Kraus
1980: Elisabeth Schacht
1981: Brigitte Kraus
1982: Martina Krott
1983: Brigitte Kraus
1984: Margrit Klinger
1985: Brigitte Kraus
1986: Brigitte Kraus
1987: Brigitte Kraus
1988: Vera Michallek
1989: Gabriele Schwarzbauer
1990: Vera Michallek

3000 metres
1973: Christa Merten
1974: Gudrun Hodey
1975: Ellen Tittel
1976: Brigitte Kraus
1977: Brigitte Kraus
1978: Birgit Friedmann
1979: Brigitte Kraus
1980: Birgit Friedmann
1981: Birgit Friedmann
1982: Birgit Friedmann
1983: Brigitte Kraus
1984: Brigitte Kraus
1985: Brigitte Kraus
1986: Brigitte Kraus
1987: Brigitte Kraus
1988: Vera Michallek
1989: Claudia Lokar
1990: Claudia Metzner

10,000 metres
1983: Charlotte Teske
1984: Charlotte Teske
1985: Charlotte Teske
1986: Kerstin Preßler
1987: Kerstin Preßler
1988: Kerstin Preßler
1989: Iris Biba
1990: Kerstin Preßler

15K run
1988: Christa Vahlensieck
1989: Iris Biba
1990: Kerstin Preßler

25K run
1977: Christa Vahlensieck
1978: Christa Vahlensieck
1979: Christa Vahlensieck
1980: Christa Vahlensieck
1981: Charlotte Teske
1982: Monika Lövenich
1983: Charlotte Teske
1984: Vera Michallek
1985: Charlotte Teske
1986: Kerstin Preßler
1987: Christina Mai

Marathon
1975: Christa Vahlensieck
1976: Christa Vahlensieck
1977: Christa Vahlensieck
1978: Christa Vahlensieck
1979: Liane Winter
1980: Christa Vahlensieck
1981: Charlotte Teske
1982: Monika Lövenich
1983: Monika Lövenich
1984: Susi Riermeier
1985: Charlotte Teske
1986: Heidi Hutterer
1987: Monika Lövenich
1988: Charlotte Teske
1989: Birgit Lennartz
1990: Gabriele Wolf

100K run
1987: Hanni Zehendner
1988: Birgit Lennartz
1989: Birgit Lennartz
1990: Birgit Lennartz

80 metres hurdles
1960: Zenta Gastl-Kopp
1961: Erika Fisch
1962: Erika Fisch
1963: Erika Fisch
1964: Inge Schell
1965: Inge Schell
1966: Karin Reichert-Frisch
1967: Inge Schell
1968: Inge Schell

100 metres hurdles
1968: Burgl Waneck
1969: Heide Rosendahl
1970: Margit Bach
1971: Margit Bach
1972: Heidi Schüller
1973: Uta Nolte
1974: Marlies Koschinski
1975: Silvia Kempin
1976: Silvia Kempin
1977: Silvia Kempin
1978: Silvia Kempin
1979: Doris Baum
1980: Silvia Kempin
1981: Silvia Kempin
1982: Heike Filsinger
1983: Ulrike Denk & Heike Filsinger
1984: Ulrike Denk
1985: Ulrike Denk
1986: Edith Oker
1987: Claudia Zaczkiewicz
1988: Claudia Zaczkiewicz
1989: Claudia Zaczkiewicz
1990: Gabi Roth

400 metres hurdles
1975: Erika Weinstein
1976: Silvia Hollmann
1977: Erika Weinstein
1978: Silvia Hollmann
1979: Silvia Hollmann
1980: Silvia Hollmann
1981: Sylvia Nagel
1982: Marlies Gutewort
1983: Mary Wagner
1984: Marlies Harnes
1985: Sabine Everts
1986: Gudrun Abt
1987: Gudrun Abt
1988: Gudrun Abt
1989: Ulrike Heinz
1990: Silvia Rieger

High jump
1960: Marlene Schmitz-Portz
1961: Ilia Hans
1962: Ingrid Becker
1963: Marlene Schmitz-Portz
1964: Marlene Schmitz-Portz
1965: Marlene Schmitz-Portz
1966: Friederun Valk
1967: Hannelore Görtz
1968: Charlotte Marx
1969: Renate Gärtner
1970: Karen Mack
1971: Renate Gärtner
1972: Ellen Mundinger
1973: Ulrike Meyfarth
1974: Karin Wagner
1975: Ulrike Meyfarth
1976: Brigitte Holzapfel
1977: Marlis Wilken
1978: Brigitte Holzapfel
1979: Ulrike Meyfarth
1980: Ulrike Meyfarth
1981: Ulrike Meyfarth
1982: Ulrike Meyfarth
1983: Ulrike Meyfarth
1984: Heike Henkel
1985: Heike Henkel
1986: Heike Henkel
1987: Heike Henkel
1988: Heike Henkel
1989: Andrea Baumert
1990: Heike Henkel

Long jump
1960: Zenta Gastl-Kopp
1961: Helga Hoffmann
1962: Helga Hoffmann
1963: Helga Hoffmann
1964: Helga Hoffmann
1965: Ursula Wittmann
1966: Helga Hoffmann
1967: Ingrid Becker
1968: Heide Rosendahl
1969: Heide Rosendahl
1970: Heide Rosendahl
1971: Heide Rosendahl
1972: Heide Rosendahl
1973: Edda Trocha
1974: Edda Trocha
1975: Christa Striezel
1976: Sabine Wecke
1977: Christa Striezel
1978: Karin Hänel
1979: Sabine Everts
1980: Sabine Everts
1981: Christina Sussiek
1982: Sabine Everts
1983: Christina Sussiek
1984: Anke Weigt
1985: Sabine Braun
1986: Monika Hirsch
1987: Andrea Breder
1988: Andrea Hannemann
1989: Annette Ganseforth
1990: Katrin Bartschat

Shot put
1960: Sigrun Grabert
1961: Sigrun Grabert
1962: Marlene Klein
1963: Sigrun Kofink
1964: Marlene Klein
1965: Marlene Klein
1966: Gertrud Schäfer
1967: Marlene Fuchs
1968: Marlene Fuchs
1969: Liesel Westermann
1970: Marlene Fuchs
1971: Marlene Fuchs
1972: Marlene Fuchs
1973: Brigitte Berendonk
1974: Eva Wilms
1975: Eva Wilms
1976: Eva Wilms
1977: Eva Wilms
1978: Eva Wilms
1979: Eva Wilms
1980: Eva Wilms
1981: Eva Wilms
1982: Claudia Losch
1983: Claudia Losch
1984: Claudia Losch
1985: Claudia Losch
1986: Claudia Losch
1987: Claudia Losch
1988: Claudia Losch
1989: Claudia Losch
1990: Claudia Losch

Discus throw
1960: Kriemhild Limberg
1961: Kriemhild Limberg
1962: Kriemhild Limberg
1963: Kriemhild Limberg
1964: Kriemhild Limberg
1965: Kriemhild Limberg
1966: Liesel Westermann
1967: Liesel Westermann
1968: Liesel Westermann
1969: Liesel Westermann
1970: Liesel Westermann
1971: Brigitte Berendonk
1972: Liesel Westermann
1973: Liesel Westermann
1974: Liesel Westermann
1975: Liesel Westermann
1976: Liesel Westermann
1977: Ingra Manecke
1978: Ingra Manecke
1979: Ingra Manecke
1980: Ingra Manecke
1981: Ingra Manecke
1982: Ingra Manecke
1983: Ingra Manecke
1984: Ingra Manecke
1985: Dagmar Galler
1986: Claudia Losch
1987: Barbara Beuge
1988: Dagmar Galler
1989: Dagmar Galler
1990: Ursula Kreutel

Javelin throw
1960: Erika Strößenreuther
1961: Anneliese Gerhards
1962: Anneliese Gerhards
1963: Anneliese Gerhards
1964: Anneliese Gerhards
1965: Anneliese Gerhards
1966: Anneliese Gerhards
1967: Ameli Koloska
1968: Ameli Koloska
1969: Ameli Koloska
1970: Ameli Koloska
1971: Anneliese Gerhards
1972: Ameli Koloska
1973: Ameli Koloska
1974: Ameli Koloska
1975: Ursula Pietschmann
1976: Marion Becker
1977: Marion Becker
1978: Eva Helmschmidt
1979: Ingrid Thyssen
1980: Ingrid Thyssen
1981: Ingrid Thyssen
1982: Ingrid Thyssen
1983: Ingrid Thyssen
1984: Ingrid Thyssen
1985: Beate Peters
1986: Beate Peters
1987: Ingrid Thyssen
1988: Ingrid Thyssen
1989: Brigitte Graune
1990: Brigitte Graune

Pentathlon
1960: Jutta Heine
1961: Helga Hoffmann
1962: Jutta Heine
1963: Helga Hoffmann
1964: Helga Hoffmann
1965: Renate Balck
1966: Heide Rosendahl
1967: Ingrid Becker
1968: Heide Rosendahl
1969: Karen Mack
1970: Heide Rosendahl
1971: Heide Rosendahl
1972: Heide Rosendahl
1973: Margot Eppinger
1974: Christel Voss
1975: Margot Eppinger
1976: Eva Wilms
1977: Eva Wilms
1978: Astrid Fredebold
1979: Beatrix Philipp
1980: Sabine Everts

Heptathlon
1981: Sabine Everts
1982: Sabine Everts
1983: Sabine Everts
1984: Anke Köninger
1985: Sabine Everts
1986: Birgit Dressel
1987: Cornelia Heinrich
1988: Sabine Everts
1989: Sabine Braun
1990: Birgit Clarius

5 kilometres walk
The 1990 event was held on a track
1980: Monika Glöckler
1981: Ingrid Adam
1982: Monika Wassel
1983: Ingrid Adam
1984: Ingrid Adam
1985: Jutta Schwoche
1986: Renate Warz
1987: Not held
1988: Not held
1989: Not held
1990: Andrea Brückmann

10 kilometres walk
1987: Cathrin Rudolph
1988: Barbara Kollorz
1989: Andrea Brückmann
1990: Renate Warz

Cross country (long course)
1970: Ellen Tittel
1971: Ellen Tittel
1972: Ellen Tittel
1973: Ellen Tittel
1974: Christa Kofferschläger
1975: Vera Kemper
1976: Vera Kemper
1977: Charlotte Teske
1978: Christa Vahlensieck
1979: Heide Brenner
1980: Ellen Tittel
1981: Monika Lövenich
1982: Charlotte Teske
1983: Charlotte Teske
1984: Monika Lövenich
1985: Charlotte Teske
1986: Charlotte Teske
1987: Iris Biba
1988: Antje Winkelmann
1989: Iris Biba
1990: Uta Pippig

Cross country (short course)
1960: Josefine Bongartz
1961: Edith Schiller
1962: Antje Gleichfeld
1963: Anita Wörner
1964: Antje Gleichfeld
1965: Antje Gleichfeld
1966: Antje Gleichfeld
1967: Karin Kessler
1968: Anita Rottmüller
1969: Maria Strickling
1970: Christa Merten
1971: Ellen Tittel
1972: Ellen Tittel
1973: Ellen Tittel
1974: Sylvia Schenk
1975: Ellen Tittel
1976: Sabine Greiner
1977: Monika Greschner
1978: Monika Greschner
1979: Ellen Tittel
1980: Ellen Tittel
1981: Brigitte Kraus
1982: Brigitte Kraus
1983: Brigitte Kraus
1984: Brigitte Kraus
1985: Christiane Finke
1986: Elisabeth Franzis
1987: Vera Michallek
1988: Ursula Starke
1989: Sabine Nolte
1990: Annette Hüls

Mountain running
1985: Christiane Fladt
1986: Olivia Grüner
1987: Christiane Fladt
1988: Birgit Lennartz
1989: Bernadette Hudy
1990: Birgit Lennartz

References

Champions 1960–1990
West German Championships. GBR Athletics. Retrieved 2021-01-29.

Winners
 List
West German Championships
Athletics